Beta Gruis (β Gruis, abbreviated Beta Gru, β Gru), formally named Tiaki , is the second brightest star in the southern constellation of Grus. It was once considered the rear star in the tail of the constellation of the (Southern) Fish, Piscis Austrinus: it, with Alpha, Delta, Theta, Iota, and Lambda Gruis, belonged to Piscis Austrinus in medieval Arabic astronomy.

Nomenclature 

β Gruis (Latinised to Beta Gruis) is the star's Bayer designation.

It bore the traditional Tuamotuan name of Tiaki. In 2016, the IAU organized a Working Group on Star Names (WGSN) to catalog and standardize proper names for stars. The WGSN approved the name Tiaki for this star on 5 September 2017 and it is now so included in the List of IAU-approved Star Names.

The Chinese name gave rise to another English name, Ke.

Properties 

This is a red giant star on the asymptotic giant branch with an estimated mass of about 2.4 times that of the Sun and a surface temperature of approximately 3,480 K, just over half the surface temperature of the Sun. This low temperature accounts for the dull red color of an M-type star. The total luminosity is about 2,500 times that of the Sun, and it has estimated 180 times the Sun's radius.

Beta Gruis is a semiregular variable (SRb) star that varies in magnitude by about 0.4. It varies between intervals when it displays regular changes with a 37-day periodicity and times when it undergoes slow irregular variability.

References

External links
MSN Encarta  (Archived 2009-10-31)

M-type giants
Semiregular variable stars
Asymptotic-giant-branch stars
Grus (constellation)
Gruis, Beta
Durchmusterung objects
214952
112122
8636